was a Japanese freestyle swimmer. He competed in the 400 m, 1500 m and 4 × 200 m events at the 1956, 1960 and 1964 Olympics and won four silver medals; he also helped Japan win a bronze relay medal in 1964 by swimming in the heat, and placed fourth in the 4 × 200 m relay in 1956 and in the 1500m in 1960. At the 1960 Olympics, he swam the fastest leg in the 4 × 200 m relay, yet his team lost to the United States.  Yamanaka won the 400 m and 1500 m events at the 1958 Asian Games.

Yamanaka studied in college at the University of Southern California, where he broke the 200 m world record three times within two months in 1961. He set two more records over 200 m earlier in 1958–59, but unfortunately for him this distance was not an Olympic event in those years. Yamanaka also set a world record over 400 m in 1959 and three world records in the 4 × 200 m relay in 1959 and 1963. Yamanaka graduated from Waseda University and later headed the Itoman Swimming School in Osaka. In 1983 he was inducted into the International Swimming Hall of Fame. In 1995, he unsuccessfully ran for the House of Councillors.

Yamanaka's coach used pebbles to communicate with him during the training sessions – whenever Yamanaka would relax the coach would throw a pebble in his back. After the training Yamanaka had to collect the pebbles from the pool bottom.

Yamanaka died from pneumonia on 10 February 2017 in Tokyo, at the age of 78.

See also
 List of members of the International Swimming Hall of Fame

References

1939 births
2017 deaths
Olympic swimmers of Japan
Swimmers at the 1956 Summer Olympics
Swimmers at the 1960 Summer Olympics
Swimmers at the 1964 Summer Olympics
World record setters in swimming
Japanese male freestyle swimmers
People from Wajima, Ishikawa
Sportspeople from Ishikawa Prefecture
Asian Games medalists in swimming
Swimmers at the 1958 Asian Games
Medalists at the 1956 Summer Olympics
Medalists at the 1960 Summer Olympics
Asian Games gold medalists for Japan
Olympic silver medalists for Japan
Olympic silver medalists in swimming
Medalists at the 1958 Asian Games
Deaths from pneumonia in Japan
20th-century Japanese people